John Massey Cashore (born March 26, 1935) is a United Church minister and former political figure in British Columbia. He represented Maillardville-Coquitlam from 1986 to 1991 and Coquitlam-Maillardville from 1991 to 2001 in the Legislative Assembly of British Columbia as a New Democratic Party (NDP) member.

He was born in Lethbridge, Alberta, the son of John Harvey Cashore and Sarah Mildred Massey, and was educated at the University of British Columbia and Union College. In 1961, he married Sharon Elizabeth Cunliffe. Cashore has lived in Coquitlam, British Columbia since 1973. He served in the provincial cabinet as Minister of Aboriginal Affairs, as Minister of Labour and as Minister of Environment, Lands and Parks. He also served as parliamentary secretary to the Minister of Education. In 2005, he became a member of the advisory council for the Georgia Strait Alliance.

References 

1935 births
Living people
British Columbia New Democratic Party MLAs
Members of the Executive Council of British Columbia
Ministers of the United Church of Canada
People from Coquitlam
People from Lethbridge
University of British Columbia alumni